Joseph Taylor (10 September 18334 May 1910), was a folk singer from Saxby-All-Saints, Lincolnshire, England, who became the first English folk singer to be commercially recorded after coming to the attention of the composer and musicologist Percy Grainger.

He popularised obscure and unique songs including "Brigg Fair", "Rufford Park Poachers" and "The White Hare", and sang influential versions of well-known songs and ballads such as "Lord Bateman" and "The Sprig of Thyme". His songs were arranged by classical composers including Grainger and Frederick Delius, and recorded by folk revival musicians beginning in the British folk revival of the 1960s.

His singing was recorded by Grainger onto wax cylinders, which have been digitised and made available online by the British Library Sound Archive as part of the Percy Grainger Collection.

Life and family

Early life 
Taylor was born in the village of Binbrook, Lincolnshire, to James Taylor (1806-1857) from Fotherby, Lincolnshire and Mary Ann Smith (1811-1898) from Barnoldby le Beck, Lincolnshire. He studied arboriculture, and eventually was in charge of a large estate comprising two villages, several farms and some woods.

Sometime around 1850, Taylor visited a gypsy camp two nights in a row to hear their songs. The gypsies taught him many songs, including "Brigg Fair".

When Taylor was in his 20s, he was imprisoned for six months at Binbrook for feeding a farmer's wheat to the farmer's own horses.

Marriage and family 
Taylor married Eliza Hill (1827-1909), who came from the village of Huttoft, and had seven children: James (1858-1915); Betsy (1860-1929); John (1864-1947); Joseph (1864-1880), who drowned in the River Ancholme at the age of 15; Anne (1867-1937); Frederick (1869-?); and Mary (1871-1967). Mary was interviewed about her father's singing by Peter Kennedy in 1953. The recording is kept by the British Library and is available online.

Later in life, Taylor worked as a farm bailiff, singing for pleasure as well as in his local church choir, and in competitions.

Appearance and personality 
Percy Grainger described Taylor as follows:<blockquote>Though his age is seventy-five his looks are those of middle age, while his flowing, ringing tenor voice is well nigh as fresh as that of his son, who has repeatedly won the first prize for tenor solo at the North Lincolnshire musical competitions. He has sung in the choir of Saxby-all-Saints Church for forty-five years. He is a courteous, genial, typical English countryman, and a perfect artist in the purest possible style of folk-song singing...He most intelligently realizes just what sort of songs collectors are after, distinguishes surprisingly between genuine traditional tunes and other ditties, and is, in every way, a marvel of helpfulness and kindliness. Nothing could be more refreshing than his hale countrified looks and the happy lilt of his cheery voice.</blockquote>

 Percy Grainger 

Percy Grainger first came into contact with Joseph Taylor when he saw him perform in the North Lincolnshire Musical Competition in 1905, which he had entered reluctantly and won with his version of ‘Creeping Jane’. Grainger first noted down ‘Brigg Fair’ from Taylor when he and Frank Kidson were collecting songs from the competitors after the competition. Grainger visited Taylor the following year when he won the competition again, singing ‘Brigg Fair’ and ‘William Taylor’. In July 1906, Grainger invited Taylor to Brigg so he could record him with the phonograph. Grainger returned again in 1908 and Taylor was again recorded.

In 1908, Grainger was instrumental in the Gramophone Company inviting Taylor to London, where a dozen of his songs were recorded, with nine subsequently being released on a series of seven gramophone discs, on the "His Master's Voice label, as part of a series billed as "Percy Grainger's Collection of English Folk-Songs sung by Genuine Peasant Performers". In the accompanying booklet, Grainger wrote:Mr. Joseph Taylor is in most respects the most exceptional folksinger I have yet heard. Although he is 75 years of age, his lovely tenor voice is as fresh as a young man's, while the ease and ring of the high notes, the freshness of his rhythmic attack, his clear intonation of modal intervals, and his finished execution of ornamental turns and twiddles (in which so many folk-singers abound) are typical of all that is best in the vocal art of the peasant traditional-singers of these islands.Though his memory for the texts of songs was not uncommonly good, his mind was a seemingly unlimited store-house of melodies, which he swiftly recalled at the merest mention of their titles. His versions were generally distinguished by the beauty of their melodic curves and by the symmetry of their construction. He relied more upon purely vocal effects than almost any folk-singer I ever heard. His dialect and his treatment of narrative points were not so exceptional, but his effortless high notes, sturdy rhythms, clean unmistakable intervals and his twiddles and ‘bleating’ ornaments (invariably executed with unfailing grace and neatness) were irresistible.

The British Library Sound Archive describes these releases as "a first in our field, and decades before any other attempt to issue real traditional singing on record for public consumption".

 Classical arrangements of his songs 
Grainger's recordings and transcriptions of Taylors's singing came to the attention of the composer Frederick Delius, who requested and secured permission to use Grainger's harmonies in his own arrangement of one of Taylor's songs, Brigg Fair. Taylor was Guest of Honour at the first performance, at the Queen's Hall in London, and reputedly stood to sing along, although his daughter Mary stated that he simply hummed along rather than sang out loud. He sat with Percy Granger, Grainger’s mother and Delius himself.

Grainger's own folksong-inspired Lincolnshire Posy (1940) was dedicated by the composer, to "the singers who sang so sweetly to me".

 Later releases and archives 

Ten of Taylor's Gramophone Company recordings were released, as Brigg Fair: Joseph Taylor and Other Traditional Lincolnshire Singers'' (Leader LEA4050) by Leader Records in 1972, alongside recordings, of Taylor and others, transferred from Grainger's wax cylinders.

Grainger's wax cylinders were copied onto lacquer discs by the Library of Congress in around 1940. The British Library digitised their set of these discs in 2018 and has made them available online.

Death and legacy 

Joseph Taylor died following an accident on the 4th of May, 1910. The following report was printed in The Lindsey and Lincolnshire Star three days later:...whilst driving out on Tuesday was thrown out of the trap on to the horse, through the animal shying at something on the road. The man, though bruised on the shoulder, continued his further five-mile drive, and drove back another ten miles. After fetching some cows from a field, he complained of severe pains in the pit of the stomach, and went to bed. Dr Morley, of Barton, was sent for, but before his arrival death had taken place.As well as being known for providing songs arranged by classical composers, many of the songs performed by Taylor and recorded by Grainger became part of the canon of the British folk revival. Martin Carthy, for example, recorded several, including "The White Hare" and "Creeping Jane".

Percy Grainger's first meeting with Joseph Taylor has been called "a major turning point in the history of traditional folk music".

List of songs 

Songs performed by Taylor, and recorded by Grainger, included:

 Barbara Ellen
 Bold Nevison 
 Bold William Taylor
 Brigg Fair
 Creeping Jane
 Died For Love
 Geordie
 Green Bushes
 Landlord And Tenant
 Lord Bateman
 Murder Maria Martin
 Once I Courted A Damsel
 Rufford Park Poachers
 The Bachelor Bright And Brave
 The Gipsy's Wedding Day
 The Gown Of Green
 The Ship's Carpenter
 The Spotted Cow
The Sprig Of Thyme
 The White Hare
 The Yarborough Hunt
 Three Times Round Went Our Gallant Ship
 When I Was Young In My Youthful Ways
 Where Are You Goin' To My Pretty Maid
 Worcester City
 Young William The Ploughboy
All of the recordings are currently available on the British Library Sound Archive website.

References

External links 

 The Percy Grainger Collection, including digitisation of Taylor's performances (British Library Sound Archive)
Interview with Mary Taylor (daughter of Joseph Taylor), 1953 (British Library Sound Archive)
Return to Brigg Fair, BBC Radio 3, 2016 - Jim Moray experiments with technology to bring the voice of Joseph Taylor and the Delius orchestral work together for the first time in over 100 years.
Brigg Fair - A memoir of Joseph Taylor by his grand-daughter E Marion Hudson

See also 
List of traditional singers

English folk singers
Musicians from Lincolnshire
1833 births
1910 deaths
19th-century British male singers
20th-century British male singers
People from the Borough of North Lincolnshire